Red Torpedo is the name of two fictional characters, one originally published by Quality Comics and another currently owned by DC Comics. The original is a superhero named Jim Lockhart while the second is an android created by T. O. Morrow. Jim Lockhart debuted in Crack Comics #1 (May 1940).

Fictional character biography

Jim Lockhart

Jim Lockhart was a navy captain until he retired in 1940. Unable to settle down, he began building a one-man submarine known as "The Red Torpedo". Using the devices on board, he became the peacekeeper of the seas, the Robin Hood of the deep. His run as a hero for Quality comics consisted of Crack Comics 1–20. His most common enemy was the Black Shark, a pirate in scuba gear. He discovered the Atlantean city of Merezonia and its Mermazon population, he later fell in love with its ruler, his former nemesis, Queen Klitra.

Hours before the attack on Pearl Harbor, Red Torpedo was recruited by Uncle Sam to join the Freedom Fighters in defending the base. He fell with the other heroes and was left for dead. Later, it was revealed that he was not dead, but he did retire after this.

Red Torpedo was seen aiding the Starman of 1951 in building his spaceship, The Flying Star. He was most recently seen as one of the administrators of Windward Home in Aquaman: Sword of Atlantis along with Elsa Magnusson, widow of Mark Merlin.

Android
A new female android Red Torpedo debuted in Red Tornado (vol. 2) #1 (November 2009). This Red Torpedo was revealed to be the first elemental android created by T. O. Morrow during the days of the Soviet Union, years before the conception of the Red Tornado. But much like her younger "sibling" the Tornado, the Torpedo rebelled against Morrow's control and he deactivated her, hiding her inside the sunken wreck of a battleship in the waters of Pearl Harbor as a type of sick joke. The Torpedo spent years inside the ship when she managed to send out a beacon to the Tornado and her two other "siblings", the Red Volcano and the Red Inferno. She is eventually found and reactivated by the Tornado, and while she readjusts to the world, she informs the Tornado about the existence of the other two elementals and the Red Volcano's cruelty. At the same time, the Tornado is having a hard time keeping the Torpedo in check, as she exhibits somewhat more lethal methods, although she claims that she doesn't intend to kill people when she tries to defend herself.

In other media
A hybridization of the Jim Lockhart and android incarnations of Red Torpedo appear in the Young Justice episode "Humanity", voiced by Jeff Bennett. This version is a male hydrokinetic android that used the alias of "Jim Lockhart" and was created by T. O. Morrow to infiltrate the Justice League sometime prior to the series, though its programming failed. In the present, Morrow reprograms Red Torpedo and sends him and Red Inferno to capture Red Tornado. However, Red Tornado convinces his fellow androids to stop Red Volcano before he causes the Yellowstone Caldera to erupt. Red Torpedo and Inferno sacrifice themselves to help Red Tornado avert the eruption.

References

External links
 Cosmic Teams: Red Torpedo 
 Golden Age Heroes Directory: Red Torpedo
 International Catalogue of Superheroes: Red Torpedo
 DCU Guide: Red Torpedo
 DCU Guide: Queen Klitra
 Mike’s Amazing World of DC Comics: Crack Comics #1

Fictional military captains
Fictional sea captains
Fictional navy personnel
DC Comics superheroes
Golden Age superheroes
Quality Comics superheroes
Comics characters introduced in 1940
Comics characters introduced in 2009
DC Comics robots
Robot superheroes